Proneomenia is a genus of Proneomeniid solenogaster.

Species
 Proneomenia acuminata Heath, 1918 - elongate solenogaster   
 Proneomenia bulbosa García-Alvarez, Zamarro & Urgorri, 2009
 Proneomenia custodiens Todt & Kocot, 2014
 Proneomenia desiderata Kowalevsky & Marion, 1887
 Proneomenia epibionta Salvini-Plawen, 1978
 Proneomenia gerlachei Pelseneer, 1901
 Proneomenia hawaiiensis Heath, 1905
 Proneomenia insularis Heath, 1911
 Proneomenia praedatoria Salvini-Plawen, 1978
 Proneomenia sluiteri Hubrecht, 1880
 Proneomenia stillerythrocytica Salvini-Plawen, 1978
 Proneomenia valdiviae Thiele, 1902
Species brought into synonymy
 Proneomenia quincarinata Ponder, 1970 : synonym of Dorymenia quincarinata (Ponder, 1970) (original combination)

References

 
 Gofas, S.; Le Renard, J.; Bouchet, P. (2001). Mollusca. in: Costello, M.J. et al. (eds), European Register of Marine Species: a check-list of the marine species in Europe and a bibliography of guides to their identification. Patrimoines Naturels. 50: 180-213

Cavibelonia